SUN (Sad1p, UNC-84) domains are conserved C-terminal protein regions a few hundred amino acids long.  SUN domains are usually found following a transmembrane domain and a less conserved region of amino acids.  Most proteins containing SUN domains are thought to be involved in the positioning of the nucleus in the cell.  It is thought that SUN domains interact directly with KASH domains in the space between the outer and inner nuclear membranes to bridge the nuclear envelope and transfer force from the nucleoskeleton to the cytoplasmic cytoskeleton which enables mechanosensory roles in cells.  SUN proteins are thought to localize to the inner nuclear membrane. The S. pombe Sad1 protein localises at the spindle pole body. In mammals, the SUN domain is present in two proteins, Sun1 and Sun2. The SUN domain of Sun2 has been demonstrated to be in the periplasm.

Examples of SUN Proteins 

Caenorhabditis elegans
SUN-1/matefin
UNC-84

Drosophila melanogaster
Klaroid
Spag4

Mammals
SUN1, SUN2, SUN3, SUN4, SUN5

Schizosaccharomyces pombe
Sad1p

Saccharomyces cerevisiae
Mps3p

Maize
SUN1, SUN2, SUN3, SUN4, SUN5

Arabidopsis
SUN1, SUN2

References 

Protein domains